Omogbolahan Gregory "Gboly" Ariyibi (born January 18, 1995) is an American professional soccer player who plays as a winger for TFF First League team MKE Ankaragücü.

Ariyibi has previously been capped by the United States under-20 and under-23 national teams.

Early life
Born in Arlington, Virginia, United States, to Nigerian parents, Ariyibi moved to England when he was two months old and resided in London before spending a short period of time living in Nigeria. Ariyibi later moved back to England and settled in Oxford. Ariyibi considers Oxford as his home town.

Club career

Southampton
Ariyibi started his youth career at English club Southampton in 2005 after being spotted playing for Oxford youth side Quarry Rovers. He came through the youth ranks with future first team regulars Luke Shaw and James Ward-Prowse. Ariyibi progressed through to the Under 21s team. He was named as one of Southampton's home-grown Under 21 players for the 2012–13 season in the official squad list.

After being released by Southampton, with Mauricio Pochettino deciding against offering Ariyibi a permanent contract, Ariyibi joined several league clubs on trial including Bolton Wanderers. He also joined UK Football Finder FC to help in enlisting a club.

Leeds United
On December 11, 2013, Ariyibi signed for Leeds United until the end of the season after a short trial spell. Upon signing for Leeds, manager Brian McDermott described Ariybi as an exciting player, very, very quick. He's a great lad too.

After suffering an injury during the club's development-squad game against Coventry City, He was then given squad number 27 shirt and on Boxing Day 2013 he was named as an unused substitute against Blackpool. On December 29, 2013, Ariybi made his Leeds United debut coming on as a second-half substitute against Nottingham Forest. He then made his second appearance for the side on January 1, 2014, against Blackburn Rovers, but this time made his first start before coming off at half time, in a 2–1 loss.

On March 25, 2014, Ariyibi joined Tranmere Rovers on loan until the end of the season. Ariyibi made his Tranmere Rovers debut on the same day, where he came on as a substitute for James Wallace in the 42nd minutes, in a 2–1 loss against Swindon Town. His second appearance came four days later against Carlisle United, again coming on a second-half substitute, in a 0–0 draw. However, with two appearances for the side, Ariyibi suffered an injury and didn't play again for the rest of the season. At the end of the season, on May 16, 2014, Ariyibi was released by Leeds United.

Chesterfield
After leaving Leeds United, Ariyibi went on trial at newly promoted Premier League side Burnley in mid-July 2014. Eventually, on August 29, 2014, Ariyibi joined Football League One side Chesterfield on a 12-month contract after turning down a deal at Premier League club Burnley.

Ariyibi made his Chesterfield debut on September 13, 2014, coming on as a late substitute, in a 1–0 loss against Scunthorpe United. However, Ariyibi struggled to regain his first team there at Chesterfield, due to being on the substitute bench and his own injury concern. By February 2015, he began to get more playing time for the side. Ariyibi then provided a double brace on February 28, 2015, in a 3–0 win over Fleetwood Town. His form soon earned him a new contract, keeping him until 2017. A week later, Ariyibi scored his first Chesterfield goal on March 14, 2015, in a 3–2 loss against Coventry City. Having become a first team regular for the rest of the season, Ariyibi finished his first season, making nineteen appearances and scoring once in all competitions.

In the 2015–16 season, Ariyibi's first opportunities began to increase following the departure of Jimmy Ryan, Sam Clucas, Tendayi Darikwa and Gary Roberts. Ariyibi appeared in the first nine league matches until he missed three matches between September 29, 2015, and October 10, 2015, due to international commitment. Weeks after returning to the first team from international commitment, Ariyibi then scored his first goal of the season, in a 4–1 win over F.C. United of Manchester in the first round of FA Cup. In the first match of 2016, Ariyibi set up two goals in a 7–1 win over Shrewsbury Town. It wasn't until on April 2, 2016, when he scored his first goal, as well as, setting up two goals, in a 4–2 win over Port Vale. This was followed up by setting up two goals, in a 2–1 win over Barnsley on April 9, 2016. Two weeks later on April 19, 2016, Ariyibi scored again, in a 1–1 draw against Doncaster Rovers. At the end of the 2015–16 season, Ariyibi went on to make forty-one appearances and scoring three times in all competitions.

In the 2016–17 season, Ariyibi's performance attracted interest from clubs, such as Reading taking interest in him. By the end of transfer window, Ariyibi stayed at the club despite rejecting a new contract from the club after they turned down bids from Championship clubs. In response to the list, Ariyibi denied claims that he requested a transfer move. Despite this, Ariyibi continued to be in the first team and then set up one of the goals, in a 3–1 win over Swindon Town on August 14, 2016. After the match, manager Danny Wilson praised his performance, stating that he's getting better and better. Up until his departure to Nottingham Forest, Ariyibi was an ever-present player since the start of the 2016–17 season.

Nottingham Forest
On January 31, 2017, Ariyibi signed for Championship club and former European Champions Nottingham Forest for an undisclosed fee. Despite impressing for the club's under-23s, Ariyibi failed to make a single appearance for the club's first-team before the end of the season under Gary Brazil, who had signed him as caretaker-manager, or Mark Warburton, Brazil's permanent successor.

On July 17, 2017, Ariyibi signed on a season long loan to Milton Keynes Dons, and scored his first goal for the club on August 8, 2017, in a 1–0 EFL Cup first round away win over Forest Green Rovers. After making 28 appearances for Milton Keynes Dons, his loan was terminated in January 2018. Shortly after, Aribiyi joined Northampton Town on loan for the remainder of the season. on April 8, 2018, Aribiyi's loan was cut short due to injury.

On January 7, 2019, Ariyibi signed on loan with Motherwell for the remainder of the 2018–19 season.

Panetolikos
On September 1, 2019, Ariyibi joined Super League Greece side Panetolikos for a two-year deal for an undisclosed fee. On November 9, 2019, helped his club to side got back on level terms (2–2) as he deflected strike beating Nikos Melissas, in a thrilling 3–2 away loss against Volos FC. It was his first goal with the club in all competitions.

International career
Ariyibi was born in the United States but is also eligible to play for Nigeria through his parents and England through upbringing. Ariybi stated in 2013 that he wanted to break into the United States youth setup.

In September 2014, Ariyibi was called up by United States under-20 team to face against Argentina U20. Ariyibi went on to make one appearance for United States U20 side. In August 2015, Ariyibi was then called up by the United States under-23 team. He made his United States U23 side debut, coming on as a late substitute in a 1–0 loss against England U21. Then, in a match against Qatar under-23 team on September 8, 2015, Ariyibi scored his first international goal.

Career statistics

References

External links

1995 births
Living people
Sportspeople from Arlington County, Virginia
American soccer players
American expatriate soccer players
American sportspeople of Nigerian descent
Yoruba sportspeople
Association football midfielders
Soccer players from Virginia
Expatriate footballers in England
Expatriate footballers in Greece
Expatriate footballers in Turkey
Leeds United F.C. players
Tranmere Rovers F.C. players
Chesterfield F.C. players
Nottingham Forest F.C. players
Milton Keynes Dons F.C. players
Northampton Town F.C. players
Motherwell F.C. players
Panetolikos F.C. players
MKE Ankaragücü footballers
English Football League players
Scottish Professional Football League players
Super League Greece players
Süper Lig players
United States men's under-20 international soccer players
United States men's under-23 international soccer players
English footballers
English people of Nigerian descent
African-American soccer players
21st-century African-American sportspeople
American expatriate sportspeople in Greece
American expatriate sportspeople in Turkey